Immaculata De Vivo is a molecular epidemiologist and professor at Harvard TH Chan School of Public Health. She is also the Editor-in-Chief of the scientific journal Cancer Causes & Control.

Background 
Immaculata De Vivo was born in Sarno, Italy and migrated to United States in 1970 She earned her bachelor's degree at St. John's University in 1986, then proceeded for her MPH and PhD degrees at Columbia University New York in 1991 and 1993 respectively. De Vivo was a postdoctoral fellow at UC Berkeley from 1993-1995 and at Stanford  University  from 1995 to 1998.

Research 
De Vivo's is known for her work on telomere length and disease risk, with special emphasis on risk of cancer development. Her work on the impact of lifestyle on disease development especially cancer is noteworthy.

References

External links 

American women epidemiologists
American epidemiologists
Harvard School of Public Health faculty
Living people
Year of birth missing (living people)